Goniotrichales is an order of red algae.

References

Red algae orders
Bangiophyceae